Ruth Davis (née Hamblin; born June 24, 1994) is a Canadian professional basketball player for the Barca CBS(W) of the LF Endesa (W). She was drafted 18th overall by the Dallas Wings in the 2016 WNBA draft. Born in Smithers, British Columbia, she played college basketball for Oregon State.

High school career
Davis attended Houston Christian School in Houston, British Columbia, where she played basketball for coach Wendall Ewald. As a senior in 2011–12, she averaged 27 points, 13 rebounds and 11 blocks per game. Over her junior and senior years, she led the team to a combined 61–2 record and won back-to-back British Columbia Senior Girls 'A' Basketball Championships.

College career
As a freshman at Oregon State in 2012–13, Davis played in 28 games and averaged 4.4 points, 2.9 rebounds and 1.1 blocks in 13 minutes per game. She recorded 32 blocks on the season, which was ranked second on the team and the third-most in Oregon State freshman history.

As a sophomore in 2013–14, Davis started all 35 games and averaged 9.5 points, 8.5 rebounds and 4.0 blocks per game. She set a school and Pac-12 single-season record with 141 blocks, tied for the 19th highest total in NCAA history. She also produced the first triple-double at Oregon State in 30 years on January 13 against Oregon with totals of 23 points, 12 rebounds and a school-record 10 blocks. At the season's end, she earned Pac-12 All-Defensive Team, All-Pac-12 Honorable Mention, first-team All-Pac-12 and Pac-12 All-Defensive Team honors.

As a junior in 2014–15, Davis averaged 12.9 points and 8.6 rebounds per game, while leading the team with 122 blocks. Her 122 blocks was the second-highest single-season total in OSU history. She was subsequently named Pac-12 Player of the Year (media), Pac-12 Defensive Player of the Year (media and coaches) and All-Pac-12 (media and coaches).

As a senior in 2015–16, Davis averaged 11.8 points and 10.0 rebounds per game, while starting all 37 games. She blocked 130 shots on the season to set the Pac-12 record for career blocks (425). She also set the Oregon State single-season record for rebounds with 370, thus setting the OSU career rebounding record with 1,027. At the season's end, she earned Pac-12 Scholar-Athlete of the Year, Pac-12 Defensive Player of the Year and first-team All-Pac-12.

College statistics

|-
| style="text-align:left;"| 2012–13
| style="text-align:left;"| Oregon State
| 28 || 0 || 13.0 || .500 || .000 || .439 || 2.9 || .0 || .3 || 1.1 || 4.4
|-
| style="text-align:left;"| 2013–14
| style="text-align:left;"| Oregon State
| 35 || 35 || 26.7 || .571 || .000 || .505 || 8.5 || .4 || .1 || 4.0 || 9.5
|-
| style="text-align:left;"| 2014–15
| style="text-align:left;"| Oregon State
| 32 || 32 || 26.6 || .580 || .000 || .725 || 8.6 || .8 || .4 || 3.8 || 12.9
|-
| style="text-align:left;"| 2015–16
| style="text-align:left;"| Oregon State
| 37 || 37 || 27.5 || .551 || .000 || .625 || 10.0 || .5 || .4 || 3.5 || 11.8
|-
| style="text-align:center;" colspan="2"|Career
| 132 || 104 || 24.0 || .560 || .000 || .586 || 7.8 || .5 || .3 || 3.2 || 9.9
|-

Source: Oregon State Beavers

Professional career
On April 14, 2016, Davis was selected in the second round of the 2016 WNBA draft with the 18th overall pick by the Dallas Wings. Exactly one month later, she made her WNBA debut in a 90–79 win over the Indiana Fever. She recorded three rebounds in just over two minutes of action, and scored one point on 1-of-2 shooting from the free throw line.

On June 9, 2016, Davis signed with the Perth Lynx for the 2016–17 WNBL season. On January 7, 2017, she had a season-best game with 21 points, eight rebounds, five blocks, three steals and three assists in a 108–67 win over the Bendigo Spirit.

On May 17, 2017, Davis signed with the Adelaide Lightning for the 2017–18 WNBL season.

In January 2018, Davis moved to France to finish the season with Tango Bourges Basket.

Davis started the 2018–19 season in Belgium with BC Castors Braine, but left in December 2018. She played the 2019–20 season in Russia with WBC Dynamo Novosibirsk, the 2020–21 season in Poland with DGT AZS Politechnika Gdanska, and the 2021–22 season in Greece with Olympiacos.

In April 2022, Davis signed with the Lakeside Lightning for the 2022 NBL1 West season. After the close of the 2022 NBL1 season, Davis joined the Barca CBS team for the 2022-23 LF Endesa (W) season.

National team career
In 2012, Davis represented Canada for the first time at the FIBA Americas U18 Championship for Women. Over four games, she averaged 3.8 points and 1.2 rebounds per game. She was promoted to the Canadian senior national team in the summer of 2013 for exhibitions in Europe and China.

Davis appeared for the Canadian senior national team at the Edmonton Grads International Classic, a three-game series against Brazil in June 2014.

References

External links
WNBA profile

1994 births
Living people
Adelaide Lightning players
All-American college women's basketball players
Basketball people from British Columbia
Basketball players at the 2018 Commonwealth Games
Basketball players at the 2019 Pan American Games
Canadian expatriate basketball people in Australia
Canadian expatriate basketball people in Belgium
Canadian expatriate basketball people in France
Canadian expatriate basketball people in the United States
Canadian women's basketball players
Centers (basketball)
Commonwealth Games competitors for Canada
Dallas Wings draft picks
Dallas Wings players
Olympiacos Women's Basketball players
Oregon State Beavers women's basketball players
Pan American Games competitors for Canada
People from Smithers, British Columbia
Perth Lynx players
Canadian expatriate basketball people in Greece
Canadian expatriate basketball people in Russia